The Ford 3-Ton M1918 was one of the first tank designs by the U.S. It was a small two-man, one-gun tank.

History
Design on the 3-ton tank started in mid-1917, before which American tank forces had been largely equipped with British or French examples. The 3-Ton was a two-man tank designed so that American forces could use another tank besides the Renault FT in battle, and was designed around the FT but as a cheaper alternative. Its two Ford Model T engines were controlled by the driver, seated at the front with a gunner beside him who had control of a .30-06 (7.62×63mm) machine gun (either a M1917 Marlin machine gun or M1919 Browning machine gun) on a limited-traverse mount with approximately 550 rounds of ammunition. 

The initial production run of the 3-ton was of fifteen vehicles; one of these was sent to France for testing. A contract for 15,000 of these vehicles was awarded; however, the U.S tank corps felt it did not meet the requirements they wanted. The contract for the 15,000 tanks was ended by the Armistice, leaving only the fifteen original vehicles produced.

The French Army evaluated the Ford 3-Ton tank and thought it inferior to the native Renault FT. However, the 3-Ton Tank was seen to have potential as a cheap, light, all-terrain artillery tractor especially for batteries of the Canon de 75 modèle 1897. One thousand five hundred 3-Ton tanks were ordered from Ford but the Armistice intervened before any were delivered and the order was cancelled.

Survivors
 There are two known survivors; one is at the U.S. Army Armor & Cavalry Collection at Fort Benning, Georgia; the other is with the Ordnance Collection at Fort Lee, Virginia.

See also
 Renault FT
 Tank Mark VIII
 Tanks of the United States
 History of the tank
 History of Ford Motor Company
 List of Ford vehicles

References

External links

 Ford 3-Ton tank(1918)
 
 

Light tanks of the United States
World War I tanks of the United States
Ford Motor Company
3-Ton M1918
History of the tank
Trial and research tanks of the United States
Tankettes